The Ével is a  long river in the Morbihan département, western France. Its source is near la Bottine, a hamlet in Radenac. It flows generally west-southwest. It is a left tributary of the Blavet into which it flows between Baud and Languidic.

Communes along its course
This list is ordered from source to mouth: Radenac, Réguiny, Moréac, Naizin, Remungol, Pluméliau, Guénin, Baud, Camors, Languidic,

References

Rivers of France
Rivers of Morbihan
Rivers of Brittany